Lac-Walker is an unorganized territory in the Côte-Nord region of Quebec, Canada. It makes up more than half of the Sept-Rivières Regional County Municipality.

It is located in the Port-Cartier-Sept-Îles Wildlife Reserve, that offers many outdoor recreation activities.

Demographics
Population trend:
 Population in 2021: 113 (2016 to 2021 population change: 4.6%)
 Population in 2016: 108 
 Population in 2011: 102 
 Population in 2006: 128
 Population in 2001: 104
 Population in 1996: 128
 Population in 1991: 88

Private dwellings occupied by usual residents: 50 (total dwellings: 59)

See also
 List of unorganized territories in Quebec

References

External links

Unorganized territories in Côte-Nord
Sept-Rivières Regional County Municipality